A Publicly Available Specification or PAS is a standardization document that closely resembles a formal standard in structure and format but which has a different development model. The objective of a Publicly Available Specification is to speed up standardization. PASs are often produced in response to an urgent market need.

Background

BSI Group develops PASs in the UK, while the International Electrotechnical Commission develops international PASs in the arena of electrical, electronic and related technologies, and the International Organization for Standardization develops international ISO PASs.
  
BSI Group pioneered the PAS format. Under the BSI model, any organization, association or group who wish to document standardized best practice on a specific subject, can commission a PAS, subject to the BSI acceptance process. A British Standard and a PAS must reach full consensus between all stakeholders on technical content. The timescale for the development of a PAS can be shorter, typically around 8 months, and is why it is sometimes referred to as a 'fast-track standard'.

The development of a PAS cannot conflict with, or contradict, existing or draft work within the formal standards arena and must complement, not conflict with, any legislation in the subject area. It is also written in accordance with BS drafting rules, which means that the content must be technically robust and cannot be technically constrained (i.e. it cannot include patented or proprietary methods or products). It is written unambiguously and with objectively verifiable requirements or recommendations.

Origin of term "PAS"

According to a BSI document "Principles of PAS standardization" 
"The term PAS was originally an acronym derived from "publicly available specification".  However, not all PAS documents are structured as specifications and the term is now sufficiently well established not to require any further amplification."  
However, early examples of PAS were actually titled "Product Approval Specification" as illustrated in the accompanying photograph showing part of PAS 003.

List of specifications
This list is not complete.

 PAS 13:2017: Code of practice for safety barriers used in traffic management within workplace environments with test methods for safety barrier impact resilience
 PAS 24: Specification for resistance of front doors to destructive entry
 PAS 55: Asset Management
 PAS 56: Business Continuity Management System (2003)
 PAS 68: Impact resistant bollards for defence against hostile vehicles.
 PAS 72: Responsible Fishing - Specification of good practice for fishing vessels
 PAS 77: IT Service continuity management code of practice
 PAS 78: Guide to good practice in commissioning accessible websites
 PAS 79: Fire risk assessment – Guidance and a recommended methodology
 PAS 82: Shopfitting and interior contracting. Management system specification
PAS 91: a standardised pre-qualification questionnaire (PQQ) for the construction industry.
 PAS 99:  Specification of common management system requirements as a framework for integration
 PAS 100: Composting specification
 PAS 101: Specification for recovered container glass
 PAS 102: Specification for processed glass for selected secondary end markets
 PAS 103: Collected waste plastics packaging
 PAS 104: Wood recycling in the panelboard manufacturing industry
 PAS 105: Recovered paper sourcing and quality. Code of practice
 PAS 555:2013: Cyber security risk. Governance and management. Specification
 PAS 754:2014: Software Trustworthiness – Governance and management – Specification
 PAS 911: Fire strategies - guidance and framework for their formulation
 PAS 777:2013: Specification for the qualification and labelling of used automotive engines and any related transmission units (2013)
 PAS 1192: A series of specifications for building information modelling (BIM).
 PAS 1192-2:2013: Specification for information management for the capital/delivery phase of construction projects using building information modelling
 PAS 1296:2018: Online age checking. Provision and use of online age check services. Code of Practice
 PAS 2010: Planning to halt the loss of biodiversity - Code of Practice
 PAS 2035/2030 Retrofitting dwellings for improved energy efficiency. Specification and guidance 
 PAS 2060: Specification for the demonstration of carbon neutrality
 PAS 3000:2015: Smart working - Code of Practice

See also 
Guideline
 Specification (technical standard)

Notes and references

External links 
 Further information on the PAS process
 ISO explanation of an ISO PAS
 UK Government PAS on digital communication infrastructures for new homes

Standards